Jalan Jenagur (Terengganu state route 134) is a major road in  Terengganu, Malaysia. It connects Kuala Berang with Jenagur, Payang Kayu, and Sultan Mahmud Power Station.

List of junctions

Roads in Terengganu